Apistogramma is a 1998 Trumans Water album released by Justice My Eye/Elevated Loin. It features a cover of the Sun Ra song: Rocket #9. Ron Paulos plays sax on #4,#5,and #7.

Track listing 
 I've Been Here Before Though I Don't Remember It (9:50)
 Skrimshaw Skalps (4:18)
 Family Style (3:52)
 Blistered And Soft (6:05)
 Cy30-Cy308 (3:29)
 The End Is A Cinch To See Even Behynd Me (4:01)
 Rocket #9 (2:32)
 Minus Time Space Plus Soul Time (1:55)
 Prune The Laggards (3:33)
 Ballad Of Finn McCool (2:36)
 Slum Summer (3:43)

References

1998 albums
Trumans Water albums